The Blues of Otis Spann is an album by blues pianist and vocalist Otis Spann recorded in London in 1964 and released by the UK Decca label.

Reception

AllMusic reviewer Bill Dahl stated "A Mike Vernon-produced British album from 1964 that was one of Spann's first full-length dates as a leader. Nice band, too".

Track listing
All compositions by Otis Spann except where noted
 "Rock Me Mama" (Arthur Crudup) − 4:20
 "I Came from Clarksdale" − 3:30
 "Keep Your Hand Out of My Pocket" − 5:10
 "Spann's Boogie" − 4:35
 "Sarah Street" − 3:35
 "The Blues Don't Like Nobody" − 4:40
 "Country Boy" (McKinley Morganfield) − 3:32 Additional track on CD reissue
 "Pretty Girls Everywhere" (Eugene Church, Thomas Williams) − 2:51 Additional track on CD reissue
 "My Home Is in the Delta" − 4:30 Additional track on CD reissue
 "Meet Me in the Bottom" − 3:45
 "Lost Sheep in the Fold" − 2:25
 "I Got a Feeling" − 4:10
 "Jangleboogie" − 3:30
 "T 99" − 5:20
 "Natural Days" − 4:00
 "You Gonna Need My Help" (Morganfield) − 4:30 Additional track on CD reissue

Personnel
Otis Spann − vocals, piano
Brother − guitar 
Ransom Knowling − bass 
Little Willie Smith – drums
Eric Clapton − guitar (track 8)
Jimmy Page − overdubbed harmonica, guitar, bass (track 8)

References

1964 albums
Otis Spann albums
Decca Records albums